"Please Forgive Me" is a song by Canadian rock musician Bryan Adams. It was released in October 1993 as the only single and bonus track from his first greatest hits compilation album, So Far So Good (1993). The single reached number seven on the US Billboard Hot 100 and number two on the Billboard Adult Contemporary chart. In the United Kingdom, it peaked at number two on the UK Singles Chart. It is his only Australian number-one single not written for a motion picture, and it also topped the charts of Belgium, Canada, France, Ireland, Norway, and Portugal.

Background

"Please Forgive Me" was written by Adams and producer Robert Lange. The song has an instrumental intro, which is only found on the album version of the song. Adams told Songfacts that it was one of the first songs that he agreed to use a modulation in.

The single reached number two in the United Kingdom, number seven in the US, and number one in Australia, Belgium, Canada, Ireland, Norway and Portugal. The song was praised by critics upon its release, and gave Adams one of his best chart performances, his most highly successful being the 1991 international chart-topping hit "(Everything I Do) I Do It for You". The song helped So Far So Good reach number one on the UK Albums Chart and in Canada and Australia. The music video for this song also received a large amount of TV airplay.

The studio band, who also appear in the video which was filmed live during the tracking dates, included keyboard players David Paich and Robbie Buchanan, guitarist Shane Fontayne, bassist James "Hutch" Hutchinson, guitarist Keith Scott, drummer Mickey Curry and producer Mutt Lange. The song was co-written and produced by Mutt Lange. It was a radio hit all over the world, and became a hit amongst Adams fans. The single has sold over three million copies worldwide.

Critical reception
Larry Flick from Billboard felt that the song "casts him in a familiar role: mournful romantic", and stated that the "guitar-framed rock ballad is an easy smash, thanks to Adams' friendly, world-weathered rasp, and an infectious chorus." He also described it as a "stately tune" and a "delicious hit of ear candy." Dave Sholin from the Gavin Report commented, "Among rock's most talented balladeers, Adams once again collaborates with "Mutt" Lange on a sensational production." A reviewer from Liverpool Echo viewed the song as "another husky ballad with the kind of simple structure and simple sentiment which should ensure the widest appeal." Pan-European magazine Music & Media wrote that it is a "unmistakably part of the Adams' family of great rock ballads." Pete Stanton from Smash Hits gave "Please Forgive Me" two out of five, feeling that it "treads the same path" as "(Everything I Do) I Do It for You", "but doesn't grab the heartstrings in the same way. The throaty vocals are still there".

Music video
The accompanying music video for "Please Forgive Me" was filmed in a recording studio and features Adams, his band and a dog. Adams and his bandmates befriended the dog—who belonged to the studio owner—whilst recording the track. The video for Adams' 2008 single "I Thought I'd Seen Everything" resembles the music video.

Track listing

Personnel
 Bryan Adams – lead vocals and rhythm guitar
 Keith Scott – lead guitar
 James "Hutch" Hutchinson – bass
 Shane Fontayne – rhythm guitar
 David Paich – piano
 Robbie Buchanan – synthesizers and organ

Charts

Weekly charts

Year-end charts

Decade-end charts

Certifications

Release history

References

1990s ballads
1993 singles
1993 songs
A&M Records singles
Bryan Adams songs
Canadian soft rock songs
Irish Singles Chart number-one singles
Number-one singles in Australia
Number-one singles in Belgium
Number-one singles in Norway
Number-one singles in Portugal
Rock ballads
RPM Top Singles number-one singles
SNEP Top Singles number-one singles
Song recordings produced by Robert John "Mutt" Lange
Songs written by Bryan Adams
Songs written by Robert John "Mutt" Lange